The Hallé Choir is a large symphonic chorus of around 170 singers based in Manchester, England. It was founded as Manchester Choral Society alongside the Hallé Orchestra in 1858 by Sir Charles Hallé. The choir gives around ten concerts a year with The Hallé at The Bridgewater Hall and other venues across the UK. Appearing with international conductors and soloists in concert and recordings, the choir performs a repertoire of major choral and operatic works ranging from mainstream pieces to more esoteric pieces and commissions.

Recent Hallé Choir Directors have included James Burton, Frances Cooke and Madeleine Venner. The current Hallé Choir Director is Matthew Hamilton.

Conductors 

 2015 to present - Matthew Hamilton
 2012 to 2015 - Madeline Venner
 2002 to 2009 - James Burton

Notable recordings 
Since the launch of the Hallé record label in 2003 the choir has appeared on a number of recordings including Holst's Hymn of Jesus (Hallé, 2013), Delius' Sea Drift (Hallé, 2013), Matthews' Aftertones (Hallé, 2014), Vaughan-Williams' A Sea Symphony (Hallé, 2015) and Elgar's Spirit of England (Hallé, 2017). The Hallé have also won a number of awards for recordings featuring the Hallé Choir:

References 

British choirs